The Latemar is a mountain in the Dolomites on the border between South Tyrol and Trentino, Italy. It is a popular hiking destination. It is best known for its view from the
Karersee lake.

References 

 Alpenverein South Tyrol

External links 

Mountains of the Alps
Mountains of South Tyrol
Mountains of Trentino
Dolomites